Angélla Christie (born February 19, 1963) in Los Angeles, California, is an American gospel saxophonist. She presently resides in Atlanta, Georgia and has made that her residence since 1987.

Christie has released eight albums and did a 40-city national tour in 2000. Her 1998 album, Hymn & I, reached the 24th spot on the Billboard Top Gospel Albums.  Her 2008 album, The Breath of Life, reached the 9th spot on the Billboard Top Contemporary Jazz and 31st spot on the Billboard Top Gospel Albums.

Discography 
 1985: Because He Lives
 1986: Rejoice
 1987: It Is Well
 1996: Eternity
 1998: Hymn & i
 2003: Draw The Line
 2008: The Breath Of Life
 2017: Intimate Conversations

Tours 
 2000: Sister's In The Spirit 2000

References

External links 
 Official website
 

1963 births
Living people
American saxophonists
Women saxophonists
21st-century saxophonists